Lerici (locally ) is a town and comune in the province of La Spezia in Liguria (northern Italy), part of the Italian Riviera. It is known as the place where the poet Percy Bysshe Shelley drowned. The town is connected by ferry to the Cinque Terre and Portovenere.

One of the main sights of Lerici is its castle which since its first founding in 1152 was used to help control the entrance of the Gulf of La Spezia. Today the castle contains a museum of palaeontology.

History
The origins of the town date back to the Etruscan period. In the Middle Ages the town came under Genoese control. After it had been sold to Lucca, it became involved in a series of conflicts between Genoa and Pisa, as it was on their common border. In 1479, the town came under Genoese sway for good.

People
Italian author Mario Soldati had a residence in the frazione of Tellaro.

Italian painter Oreste Carpi spent many years in San Terenzo making hundreds of paintings and drawings reproducing town landscapes.

English writers Mary Shelley and Percy Bysshe Shelley lived some five kilometres north in an isolated old boathouse called Casa Magni and anchored their sailing boat in Lerici. Their closest neighbours were the villagers of the tiny hamlet of San Terenzo.  Percy Bysshe Shelley drowned on 8 July 1822 in the Bay of Spezia, returning to Lerici from a journey to Livorno and Pisa.  His corpse eventually washed up on the beach at Viareggio, located approximately halfway between Livorno and Lerici. Though the Italian poet and writer Sem Benelli first referred to the Golfo di Lerici, as the Golfo dei Poet in 1910 to commemorate the death of Italian writer Paolo Mantegazza, (a famous Italian writer, neurologist, physiologist, and anthropologist) at his residence in San Terenzo di Lerici, the popularity of Lerici with the Shelleys and with Lord Byron helped promote the title Golfo dei Poeti, Poet's Bay, for the Golfo di Lerici.

Hungarian author Baroness Emmuska Orczy, author of The Scarlet Pimpernel, had a villa built in the hills above Lerici, near the locality of Bellavista, and called it La Padula. Orczy and her husband Montague Barstow spent several months there in the 1930s – alternating between La Padula, Villa Bijou in Monte Carlo, and trips to Britain. Eventually, they decided to abandon fascist Italy for Villa Bijou. La Padula still stands today.

Culture
Lerici is one of the mariner communities which take part in the Palio del Golfo, a rowing contest held in La Spezia every first Sunday of August.

Twin towns
 Mougins, France, since 26 October 2008

Lerici is also twinned with Horsham, in England, although the latter no longer records this as an "active" twinning on its official website. Horsham is where Shelley was born, and Lerici where he died.

References

External links

Official website
Lerici Travel Guide
Website of Pro Loco Lerici Learn about the events and tourist activities.
Lerici Walks Castle to Castle Walk Description.
Museum of palaeontology

Coastal towns in Liguria
Cities and towns in Liguria
Italian Riviera